kw, kW or KW may refer to:

Businesses 
 Kamera-Werkstätten, a German camera manufacturer
 Keller Williams Realty, an American real estate company
 Kenworth, an American truck manufacturer
 Kompania Węglowa, a Polish coal mining company
 KW – Das Heizkraftwerk, a former nightclub in Munich, Germany

Computing
 .kw, the country code top level domain (ccTLD) for Kuwait
 Keyword (Internet search)
 Kiloword, a memory size increment

Places
 Key West, Florida, United States
 KW postcode area, covering Kirkwall and Orkney, United Kingdom
 Kitchener–Waterloo, Ontario, Canada
 Kuwait (ISO 3166-1 country code KW)

Other uses
 KW (album), 1998 album by Keith Washington
 Kilowatt (kW), a unit of power
 Cornish language
 Kw (digraph), in the Latin alphabet
 Kwangwoon University, in Seoul, South Korea
 Kw, the self-ionization constant of water; see self-ionization of water
 K.W., a character in the 2009 film Where the Wild Things Are
 KW, a short code for the National Herbarium of Ukraine